The underwriter's knot is used in electrical wiring as strain relief to prevent a cable from being pulled from electrical terminals when the cable is yanked.

History 
Clifford Ashley listed it as an electrician's knot in 1944.  He suggested it be used "where rough treatment is expected" and described it as a two-strand wall knot.

The name may come from its use by fire underwriters, who understood its importance in electrocution and fire prevention.

Function 
The knot is typically used as a stopper knot where a lamp or appliance cord passes through a hole or slot of a plug or socket. Its purpose is to "reduce strain on the screw terminal connections—where the metal parts of the wires connect to the socket or plug—and prevent the wires from pulling free."

See also
List of knots

References

External links
How to tie an Underwriter's Knot. Animated Knots.

Climbing knots
Double knots
Cables